Johann Friedrich Wender (baptized 6 December 1655 – 13 June 1729) was a German organ builder who had his workshop in Mühlhausen.

Born in Dörna, Thuringia, Wender collaborated with Johann Sebastian Bach, who obtained his first position as an organist in Arnstadt from 1703, after he had inspected and demonstrated a new organ which Wender had built there. In 1707 Bach moved to Mühlhausen, where Wender worked. Wender died in Dörna.

Selected works

Literature 

 

 

 

1655 births
1729 deaths
People from Unstrut-Hainich-Kreis
German pipe organ builders